Foreign Correspondent may refer to:

Foreign correspondent (journalism)
Foreign Correspondent (film), an Alfred Hitchcock film
Foreign Correspondent (TV series), an Australian current affairs programme